Demetrida metallica is a species of ground beetle in Lebiinae subfamily. It was described by Barry Philip Moore in 1967 and is found in Australia.

References

Beetles described in 1967
Beetles of Australia
metallica